Dingee railway station is located on the Piangil line in Victoria, Australia. It serves the town of Dingee, and it opened on 21 June 1883 as Talambe. It was renamed Dingee on 15 October 1883. Dingee Railway Station is also known as the least used railway station in Victoria.

History

Dingee opened on 21 June 1883, after the line from Raywood was extended to Mitiamo. The station, like the township itself, was named after an Aboriginal word meaning star.

The station was destroyed by fire on 7 March 1944.

The former Public Transport Corporation had plans to sell the station in 1992, however this did not eventuate.

The recently reopened Raywood station is located between Dingee and Eaglehawk, while disused station Mitiamo is located between Dingee and Pyramid.

Dingee Railway Station is the least used railway station in Victoria, recording 250 passenger movements in the 2020/21 financial year, less than 1 passenger per day.

Platforms and services

Dingee has one platform. It is serviced by V/Line Swan Hill line services.

Platform 1:
 services to Southern Cross and Swan Hill

References

External links

Victorian Railway Stations gallery
Melway map at street-directory.com.au

Regional railway stations in Victoria (Australia)